The 1903 Shurtleff football team represented Shurtleff College during the 1903 college football season. The team played at Sportsman's Park in Alton, Illinois. The field was owned by the Western Military Academy.

Schedule

References

Shurtleff
Shurtleff Pioneers football seasons
Shurtleff football